Stephen E. Dignan (April 16, 1861 – July 11, 1881) was an American Major League Baseball outfielder from Boston, Massachusetts, who played for the Boston Red Caps and Worcester Ruby Legs during the  season. He died in his hometown of Boston at the age of 20 due to consumption, and is interred at Mount Calvary Cemetery, in Roslindale, Boston, Massachusetts.

References

External links

1861 births
1881 deaths
Baseball players from Massachusetts
Major League Baseball right fielders
Boston Red Caps players
Worcester Ruby Legs players
19th-century baseball players
Nationals of Washington players
19th-century deaths from tuberculosis
Tuberculosis deaths in Massachusetts